Irene of Hungary (Greek: Είρήνη, born Piroska; died 13 August 1134) was a Byzantine empress by marriage to John II Komnenos. She is venerated as a saint.

Life
The name Piroska was a Hungarian derivation of the Latin name Prisca, literally meaning 'ancient', but implying 'serious' or 'grave' behaviour. She was a daughter of Ladislaus I of Hungary and Adelaide of Swabia. Her mother died in 1090 when Piroska was still a child. Her father died on 29 July 1095 and was succeeded by his nephew Coloman.

In an effort to improve relations with Alexios I Komnenos of the Byzantine Empire, Coloman negotiated the marriage of Piroska to John II Komnenos. John II was the eldest son of Alexios I and Irene Doukaina. He was already co-ruler of his father since late 1092 and was expected to succeed him.

The negotiations were successful and Piroska married John in 1104. The marriage was recorded by Joannes Zonaras and John Kinnamos. Following her conversion to the Eastern Orthodox Church and settlement in Constantinople, Piroska was renamed Irene.

Irene played little part in government, devoting herself to piety and her many children. She was, with her husband, the patron of the construction of the Monastery of Christ Pantokrator (Zeyrek Mosque) in Constantinople. This monastery contained three churches and a hospital of 5 wards, which was open to people of all social classes.

Irene died on 13 August 1134 and was later venerated as Saint Irene.

Issue
She and John had eight children. The primary source about their order of births is the chronicle of Niketas Choniates:

 Alexios Komnenos (February 1106 – 1142), co-emperor from 1122 to 1142. His birth is recorded in the AlexiadAlexiad by Anna Komnene.
 Maria Komnene (twin to Alexios), who married John Rogerios Dalassenos.
 Andronikos Komnenos (died 1142).
 Anna Komnene, married Stephen Kontostephanos.
 Isaac Komnenos (died 1154).
 Theodora Komnene (died 12 May 1157), who married Manuel Anemas.
 Eudokia Komnene, who married Theodore Vatatzes.
 Manuel I Komnenos (died 1180), emperor from 1143 to 1180.

Citations

Sources 
Joannes Zonaras, Extracts of History.
John Kinnamos, Chronicle.
Anna Komnene, Alexiad
Niketas Choniates, Chronicle

External links 

Her profile along with her husband in "Medieval Lands" by Charles Cawley

1134 deaths
Komnenos dynasty
11th-century Hungarian women
12th-century Hungarian women
12th-century Byzantine empresses
12th-century Christian saints
Hungarian princesses
Beatified and canonised Árpádians
People from Esztergom
Converts to Eastern Orthodoxy from Roman Catholicism
House of Árpád
Christian female saints of the Middle Ages
Burials at the Monastery of Christ Pantocrator (Constantinople)
Mothers of Byzantine emperors
Daughters of kings